Daallo Mountain is a national park in the eastern Sanaag region of Somaliland. It is a part of the Ogo Mountains.

Daallo is a prime example of an unspoiled wilderness, a dense forest on a limestone and gypsum escarpment near to the base of Mount Shimbiris, Somaliland's tallest peak.

Daallo, has historically been inhabited by the ancient ancestors of most of the original Somali tribes. 

Some of the trees in the park are over 1000 years old.

Many plants from the park have medicinal value.

See also
Administrative divisions of Somaliland
Regions of Somaliland
Districts of Somaliland
Somalia–Somaliland border

Notes

References

National parks of Somaliland
Important Bird Areas of Somaliland
Somali montane xeric woodlands